John G Rowan (16 August 1890 – 4 December 1963) was a Scottish footballer who played for Dumbarton, Hamilton Academical, and Dunfermline Athletic.

References

1890 births
Scottish footballers
Dumbarton F.C. players
Hamilton Academical F.C. players
Dunfermline Athletic F.C. players
Scottish Football League players
1963 deaths
Footballers from Fife
Association football forwards
People from Hill of Beath
Glasgow Perthshire F.C. players
Scottish Junior Football Association players